All the Sad Young Men is the third collection of short stories written by F. Scott Fitzgerald, published  by Scribners in February 1926.

Composition
Fitzgerald wrote the stories at a time of disillusionment. He was in financial difficulty, he believed his wife Zelda was romantically involved with another man, she had suffered a series of physical illnesses, and his play The Vegetable had been a failure. The book was dedicated to Ring and Ellis Lardner, who were neighbors at the time the book was published.

Contents
The volume contains nine stories:

 "The Rich Boy"
 "Winter Dreams"
 "The Baby Party"
 "Absolution"
 "Rags Martin-Jones and the Pr-nce of W-les"
 "The Adjuster"
 "Hot and Cold Blood"
 "The Sensible Thing""
 "Gretchen's Forty Winks"

As with his other collections, its release was timed to follow the completion of his most recent novel, The Great Gatsby.  Fitzgerald wrote "Absolution", one of the best-received stories in the collection,  as a false start to Gatsby.

Reception
Upon publication—and somewhat belying the notion that Fitzgerald's most famous novel had not been enthusiastically received—The New York Times wrote, "The publication of this volume of short stories might easily have been an anti-climax after the perfection and success of 'The Great Gatsby' of last Spring. A novel so widely praised — by people whose recognition counts — is stiff competition. It is even something of a problem for a reviewer to find new and different words to properly grace the occasion. It must be said that the collection as a whole is not sustained to the high excellence of 'The Great Gatsby,' but it has stories of fine insight and finished craft."

Ironically, in a letter nine months earlier, Fitzgerald had advised his editor Max Perkins against publicizing the book through the newspaper. "Rather not use advertising appropriation in Times—people who read Times Book Review won't be interested in me."

References

External links
 
 
 
 The New York Times Book Review in March, 1926, on All the Sad Young Men

1926 short story collections
Short story collections by F. Scott Fitzgerald
Charles Scribner's Sons books